Helen Kim (1907-1937) was an American actress who worked on Broadway and in radio in the 1920s and 1930s.

Beginnings and career 
Kim was born in Baltimore, Maryland, to William June Kim and Lillian Turner. Her father was Korean, and her mother was Euro-American. After being raised in New York City with her two siblings, Kim attended the University of California at Berkeley. She soon began appearing in Broadway plays like Roar China and The Gilded Princess.

Personal life 
Kim made headlines in 1930 when a poet she had been dating, Robert Carroll Pew, committed suicide in front of her by drinking poison. She later married Randolph J. Thomson, who represented himself as a wealthy British theatrical producer, but he ended up being a fraud. The same day she secured a divorce from Thomson, she married her second husband, interior designer James Mont, who is associated with the Hollywood Regency craze of the 1940s and 1950s.

Death 
Twenty-nine days after marrying Mont, Kim committed suicide in her Manhattan apartment's kitchen by inhaling gas. At the time, partygoers had gathered in her building for a murder mystery party thrown by another tenant, and journalists mistakenly reported that Helen had planned the affair.

Selected Broadway credits 

 Roar China
 The Gilded Princess
 The Shanghai Gesture

References 

American film actresses
1907 births
1937 deaths
Actresses from Maryland
People from Baltimore
Actresses from Baltimore
American stage actresses
American people of Korean descent
1937 suicides